This is a list of electoral division results for the Australian 1993 federal election in the state of New South Wales.

Overall results

Results by division

Banks 
 This section is an excerpt from Electoral results for the Division of Banks § 1993

Barton 
 This section is an excerpt from Electoral results for the Division of Barton § 1993

Bennelong 
 This section is an excerpt from Electoral results for the Division of Bennelong § 1993

Berowra 
 This section is an excerpt from Electoral results for the Division of Berowra § 1993

Blaxland 
 This section is an excerpt from Electoral results for the Division of Blaxland § 1993

Bradfield 
 This section is an excerpt from Electoral results for the Division of Bradfield § 1993

Calare 
 This section is an excerpt from Electoral results for the Division of Calare § 1993

Charlton 
 This section is an excerpt from Electoral results for the Division of Charlton § 1993

Chifley 
 This section is an excerpt from Electoral results for the Division of Chifley § 1993

Cook 
 This section is an excerpt from Electoral results for the Division of Cook § 1993

Cowper 
 This section is an excerpt from Electoral results for the Division of Cowper § 1993

Cunningham 
 This section is an excerpt from Electoral results for the Division of Cunningham § 1993

Dobell 
 This section is an excerpt from Electoral results for the Division of Dobell § 1993

Eden-Monaro 
 This section is an excerpt from Electoral results for the Division of Eden-Monaro § 1993

Farrer 
 This section is an excerpt from Electoral results for the Division of Farrer § 1993

Fowler 
 This section is an excerpt from Electoral results for the Division of Fowler § 1993

Gilmore 
 This section is an excerpt from Electoral results for the Division of Gilmore § 1993

Grayndler 
 This section is an excerpt from Electoral results for the Division of Grayndler § 1993

Greenway 
 This section is an excerpt from Electoral results for the Division of Greenway § 1993

Gwydir 
 This section is an excerpt from Electoral results for the Division of Gwydir § 1993

Hughes 
 This section is an excerpt from Electoral results for the Division of Hughes § 1993

Hume 
 This section is an excerpt from Electoral results for the Division of Hume § 1993

Hunter 
 This section is an excerpt from Electoral results for the Division of Hunter § 1993

Kingsford Smith 
 This section is an excerpt from Electoral results for the Division of Kingsford Smith § 1993

Lindsay 
 This section is an excerpt from Electoral results for the Division of Lindsay § 1993

Lowe 
 This section is an excerpt from Electoral results for the Division of Lowe § 1993

Lyne 
 This section is an excerpt from Electoral results for the Division of Lyne § 1993

Macarthur 
 This section is an excerpt from Electoral results for the Division of Macarthur § 1993

Mackellar 
 This section is an excerpt from Electoral results for the Division of Mackellar § 1993

Macquarie 
 This section is an excerpt from Electoral results for the Division of Macquarie § 1993

Mitchell 
 This section is an excerpt from Electoral results for the Division of Mitchell § 1993

New England 
 This section is an excerpt from Electoral results for the Division of New England § 1993

Newcastle 
 This section is an excerpt from Electoral results for the Division of Newcastle § 1993

North Sydney 
 This section is an excerpt from Electoral results for the Division of North Sydney § 1993

Page 
 This section is an excerpt from Electoral results for the Division of Page § 1993

Parkes 
 This section is an excerpt from Electoral results for the Division of Parkes § 1993

Parramatta 
 This section is an excerpt from Electoral results for the Division of Parramatta § 1993

Paterson 
 This section is an excerpt from Electoral results for the Division of Paterson § 1993

Prospect 
 This section is an excerpt from Electoral results for the Division of Prospect § 1993

Reid 
 This section is an excerpt from Electoral results for the Division of Reid § 1993

Richmond 
 This section is an excerpt from Electoral results for the Division of Richmond § 1993

Riverina 
 This section is an excerpt from Electoral results for the Division of Riverina § 1993

Robertson 
 This section is an excerpt from Electoral results for the Division of Robertson § 1993

Shortland 
 This section is an excerpt from Electoral results for the Division of Shortland § 1993

Sydney 
 This section is an excerpt from Electoral results for the Division of Sydney § 1993

Throsby 
 This section is an excerpt from Electoral results for the Division of Throwsby § 1993

Warringah 
 This section is an excerpt from Electoral results for the Division of Warringah § 1993

Watson 
 This section is an excerpt from Electoral results for the Division of Watson § 1993

Wentworth 
 This section is an excerpt from Electoral results for the Division of Wentworth § 1993

Werriwa 
 This section is an excerpt from Electoral results for the Division of Werriwa § 1993

See also 
 Results of the 1993 Australian federal election (House of Representatives)
 Members of the Australian House of Representatives, 1993–1996

Notes

References 

New South Wales 1993